Henry Riley (1797–1848) was a British surgeon, anatomist, naturalist, geologist and paleontologist. He is notable for being the co-discoverer and co-describer of the archosaur Palaeosaurus and the dinosaur Thecodontosaurus.

Biography
Henry Riley was born in Bristol in 1797. He trained to become a surgeon in Paris and he graduated during the mid-1820s. He was one of the men who founded the Bristol Institution in the 1820s. Riley was involved in a body snatching scandal in the late 1820s - he was fined £6 (inflated to £657.29 in 2019) in 1828. He was later revoked of this claim during the 1830s.

His Geoffroyan lectures of 1831-33 were the first to be heard in Bristol. He was a physician at St. Peter's Hospital, Bristol in 1832 and the Bristol Royal Infirmary between 1834-1847. He taught at Bristol Medical School until he retired in 1846.

In the autumn of 1834, Riley and the curator of the Bristol Institution, Samuel Stutchbury, began to excavate "saurian remains" at the quarry of Durdham Down, at Clifton, presently a part of Bristol, which is part of the Magnesian Conglomerate. In 1834 and 1835, they briefly reported on the finds. They provided their initial description in 1836, naming the new genera Palaeosaurus and Thecodontosaurus.

Riley died in 1848 in Bristol, aged 50 or 51.

References 

19th-century surgeons
English surgeons
English palaeontologists
English naturalists
19th-century English scientists
1797 births
1848 deaths
Scientists from Bristol
19th-century naturalists
19th-century English medical doctors